Parents in Progress is a 2019 Italian comedy-drama film directed by Laura Chiossone.

Cast
Anna Foglietta as Simona Riva
Paolo Calabresi as Aldo Luini
Lucia Mascino as Ilaria Luini
Marina Rocco as Sabrina
Elena Radonicich as Giorgia
Francesco Turbanti as Paolo Lanucci
Paolo Mazzarelli as Alessandro
Marina Occhionero as Luisa
Nicolò Costa as Filippo

References

External links

2019 films
2010s Italian-language films
2019 comedy films
Italian comedy-drama films
2010s Italian films